Marija Karan (born 29 April 1982) is a Serbian actress. She had her film debut in Kad porastem biću Kengur and appeared after this in Jesen stiže, dunjo moja.

She was born in Belgrade. In 2007, Karan appeared alongside Nikola Kojo and Bogdan Diklić in the Serbian thriller Četvrti čovek (The fourth Man) by Dejan Zečević and alongside Branko Tomović in the British Drama Taximan by Henrik Norrthon. Marija Karan was also introduced in a FOX TV Series called Odd Mom Out.

She appeared on the December 2011 cover of Serbian Cosmopolitan magazine.

Filmography

Television

Films

External links 
 

1982 births
Living people
Serbian film actresses
Actresses from Belgrade
21st-century Serbian actresses
Serbian television actresses
Serbian voice actresses